Uppaluris is a Telugu surname originating from Gudivada in the Krishna district of Andhra Pradesh of India. They sometimes belong to the class of Brahmins & Kammas. The lineage of noted Uppaluri, U.G. Krishnamurti, is detailed in The Seed Beneath the Volcano. Alternative spellings of this surname include Uppuluri, Vuppuluri and Vuppulury.

Social groups of Andhra Pradesh